The 2022–23 season is the 121st season in the existence of Go Ahead Eagles and the club's second consecutive season in the top flight of Dutch football. In addition to the domestic league, Go Ahead Eagles are participating in this season's edition of the KNVB Cup.

Players

Pre-season and friendlies

Competitions

Overall record

Eredivisie

League table

Results summary

Results by round

Matches 
The league fixtures were announced on 17 June 2022.

KNVB Cup

References 

Go Ahead Eagles seasons
Go Ahead Eagles